Grete Rikko (born Grete Rindskopf; 1908–1998) was a German-American abstract expressionist who lived most of her life in New York. She was the sister of musicologist Fritz Rikko.

Education and early career 
Rikko was born in Germany and studied painting at the Volkswangschule in Essen. In 1928, she relocated to Paris and enrolled in the Académie Ranson. In Paris, Rikko studied under Roger Bissière and André Derain and participated in several group exhibitions. In 1933, she relocated to Belgrade, Yugoslavia, where she held several solo exhibitions. During her time in Paris and Belgrade, Rikko made study trips to Belgium, Greece, Italy, Spain, and Switzerland, where she painted landscapes and portraits.

New York years 
In 1937, Rikko immigrated to the United States and settled in Greenwich Village. Rikko’s painting style changed radically after her move to the United States. A 1955 reviewer wrote that, “[i] n Europe, her art was more or less impressionistic, but on the other side of the Atlantic Ocean she was converted to abstract art or she puts it herself to abstract-impressionalism.” Describing her new work, Rikko stated that “the subject is still discernable even though it has been fully reduced to a symbol.”

Rikko exhibited widely in the United States and in Western Europe during the 1950s and 1960s, including at the Gemeentemuseum (Arnhem, Netherlands), the Bodley Gallery (New York), and the Bouwcentrum (Rotterdam, Netherlands). In 1956, Rikko was commissioned to paint a mural in the Bouwcentrum, which also featured a site-specific sculpture by Henry Moore.

Selected solo and group exhibitions 
 Gemaelde Galerie Schaumann, Essen, 1930
 Künsthalle, Düsseldorf, 1930 
 Salon d’Automne, Paris, 1931
 Jeune Europe, Paris, 1932
 Gemaelde Galerie Schaumann, Essen, 1932
 Künsthandlung Viktor Hartberg, Berlin, 1933
 Franzusko-Srpskog Klubam, Belgrade, 1933
 Franzusko-Srpskog Klubam, Belgrade, 1937
 New Americans of Friendship House, New York World's Fair, 1939
 Carroll College, Helena, Montana, 1941
 British Art Center, New York, 1945
 Village Art Center, New York, 1949
 Village Art Center, New York, 1953
 Village Art Center Eleven Year Retrospective Exhibition at the Whitney Museum of American Art, New York, 1954
 Kunstzaal Plaats, the Hague, 1954
 Magdalena Sothmann, Amsterdam, 1956
 Gemeentemuseum, Arnhem, 1957
 Galerie t'Venster, Rotterdam, 1958
 Bodley Gallery, New York, 1959
 Bodley Gallery, New York, 1960
 The Little Gallery, Philadelphia, 1960
 Cocoa-Tree LTD, Atlanta, 1960
 Bouwcentrum, Rotterdam, 1960
 G Gemaelde Galerie Schaumann, Essen, 1961
 Hanover Gallery, London, 1962
 Bodley Gallery, New York, 1967

References

1908 births
1998 deaths
American women painters
20th-century American women artists